Kokama or Cocama may refer to:
 Kokama people, an ethnic group of the Amazon
 Cocama language, their language

See also 
 Cacoma, a town in Angola
 Cacama (disambiguation)

Language and nationality disambiguation pages